The Kapasiya are Hindu caste found in the state of Uttar Pradesh and haryana in India. They are also known as Khunkhuniya Bhatt comes in Gurjar caste.They found mainly in bulandshahar, faridabad, mujjafarnagar. There are some village of kapasiya gujjar mirzapur agarpur, mursana, mujedi.

Origin 

The word kapariya is derived from the Hindi word kapra, which means a cloth. They claim to be a branch of the Bhatt community, that took to begging. A change of occupation led to an evolution of a distinct community. They have two sub-divisions, the Brahma Bhatta and Rao Bhatta. The Kapariya are found mainly in Fatehpur district, where they are considered the original settlers. They speak Awadhi among themselves, and Hindi with outsiders.

Present circumstances 

The Kapariya are strictly endogamous and their two sub-divisions, the Brahma Bhatta and Rao Bhatta, are also endogamous. They are further divided into a number of exogamous sub-divisions, known as gotras. The main function of the gotra is to trace descent and to regulate their marriage alliances. The Brahma Bhatta claim a higher status from the Rao Bhatta, a system of hypergamy exists among these two groups.

The Kapariya are a landless community, and are still involved in their traditional occupation is begging. Many have seen a decline in their traditional occupation, and are employed as day labourers. A small number have been granted land, but their land holdings are extremely small. Like other Hindu castes, each Kapariya settlement contains a biradari panchayat, an informal caste association, which acts as an instrument of social control.

The 2011 Census of India for Uttar Pradesh showed the Kapariya Scheduled Caste population as 20,205.

References 

Indian castes
Scheduled Castes of Uttar Pradesh